The first seeds Pat O'Hara Wood and Gerald Patterson defeated second-seeded James Anderson and Fred Kalms 6–4, 9–7, 7–5 in the final, to win the men's doubles tennis title at the 1925 Australasian Championships.

Seeds

  Pat O'Hara Wood /  Gerald Patterson (champions)
  James Anderson /  Fred Kalms (final)
  Gar Hone /  Rupert Wertheim (semifinals)
  Les Baker /  Norman Peach (semifinals)
  Jack Cummings /  Bob Spencer (quarterfinals)
  Aubrey Willard /  Jim Willard (quarterfinals)
  Keith Poulton /  Bob Schlesinger (quarterfinals)
  Bruce Dive /  Allan Hall (second round)

Draw

Finals

Earlier rounds

Section 1

Section 2

Section 3

Section 4

Notes

 Often spelled Berckleman.
 C. B. Moon, elder brother of Gar. Often misspelled as T. B. Moon.

References

External links
 Source for seedings
 Source for the draw

1925 in Australian tennis